Kondgaon is a village in Sangameshwar Taluka in Ratnagiri district of Konkan division of the Indian state of Maharashtra. It is a main village on the  Ratnagiri to Kolhapur national highway. Kondgaon is located on the Kajali river.

Crops 
Rice, cashews and Alphanso mangoes are the major crops in Kondgaon.

References 

Villages in Ratnagiri district